The Flower of the Caucasus (Italian:Il fiore del Caucaso) is a 1920 Italian silent film directed by Augusto Camerini.

Cast
 Carmen Boni 
 Romano Calò 
 Margherita Losanges

References

Bibliography
 Stewart, John. Italian film: a who's who. McFarland, 1994.

External links

1920 films
1920s Italian-language films
Films directed by Augusto Camerini
Italian silent feature films
Italian black-and-white films